HoDoMS (Heads of Departments of Mathematical Sciences) is an educational company that acts as a body to represent the heads of United Kingdom higher education departments of mathematical sciences. It aims to discuss and promote the interests of higher education mathematics in the UK and to facilitate dialogue between departments.

Governance

HoDoMS is operated by a committee including four officer roles which are listed below with incumbents. The committee includes observers from the Institute of Mathematics and its Applications, The OR Society, the Royal Statistical Society, the Council for the Mathematical Sciences and the Edinburgh Mathematical Society.

Activities
The main activity of HoDoMS is to run an annual conference bringing members together for briefings and discussion on current issues. For example, the 2020 conference heard briefings on policy issues such as research funding, the Research Excellence Framework 2021, the Teaching Excellence Framework as well as practicalities such as online marking, knowledge exchange, teaching as a career for mathematics undergraduates, and academics and mental health.

HoDoMS also collaborates with other organisations, for example with the London Mathematical Society on an 'Education Day' in 2019 and with the Institute of Mathematics and its Applications and the Isaac Newton Institute on an 'Induction Course for New Lecturers in the Mathematical Sciences' in 2021

History
The first meeting of HoDoMS took place on 14th September 1995 at University College, London under its first chair, Graham Wilks. On 14th August 2018, HoDoMS was incorporated as a Private company limited by guarantee.

Affiliations
HoDoMS is a member of the Joint Mathematical Council of the United Kingdom (JMC).

References

External links
 HoDoMS Web site

Mathematics education in the United Kingdom
Science and technology in the United Kingdom
1995 establishments in the United Kingdom
Organizations established in 1995